The Popular Mobilization Forces (PMF) ( al-Ḥashd ash-Shaʿbī), also known as the People's Mobilization Committee (PMC) and the Popular Mobilization Units (PMU), is an Iraqi state-sponsored umbrella organization composed of approximately 67 different armed factions, with around 128,000 fighters that are mostly Shia Muslim groups, but also include Sunni Muslim, Christian, and Yazidi groups.  However, an investigation led by Former Prime Minister of Iraq, Haider al-Abadi revealed that approximately 60,000 are real soldiers, while the others 70,000 are "Ghost soldiers". The Popular Mobilization Units as a group was formed in 2014 and have fought in nearly every major battle against ISIL. It has been called the new Iraqi Republican Guard after it was fully reorganized in early 2018 by its then–Commander in Chief Haider al-Abadi, Prime Minister of Iraq from 2014 to 2018, who issued "regulations to adapt the situation of the Popular Mobilization fighters". Some of its component militias are considered terrorist groups by some states, while others have been accused of sectarian violence. During the 2019–2021 Iraqi protests, the organisation was accused of killing and wounding large numbers of protesters and activists.

Logos and flags 
While the factions have their own flags, a yellow or white flag with the phrase "Al-Hashd Al-Sha'bi" is also used by PMF along with the Iraqi flag.

Name 
With regard to the official native name, the Arabic word  (ash-Shaʿbī) translates as "people's" or "popular", as referred to the people; the Arabic word  (al-Ḥashd) translates as "mobilization", as in the group of people mobilized rather than the process of mobilization. In other contexts, al-hashd may translate as other terms such as "crowd", "horde", "throng", "gathering" .

Background and formation 

Originally, there were seven forces in the PMF, which had been operating with Nouri al-Maliki's support since early 2014. These were:
 Badr Organization
 Asa'ib Ahl al-Haq
 Kata'ib Hezbollah
 Kata'ib Sayyid al-Shuhada
 Harakat Hezbollah al-Nujaba
 Kata'ib al-Imam Ali
 Kata'ib Jund al-Imam.

According to Faleh A. Jabar and Renad Mansour for the Carnegie Middle East Center, Prime Minister Nouri al-Maliki used these forces to combat the emergence of ISIL and maintain his influence in predominantly Sunni areas.

The People's Mobilization Forces (PMF) were formed by the Iraqi government on 15 June 2014 after top Iraqi Shia cleric Ali al-Sistani's non-sectarian fatwa on "Sufficiency Jihad" on 13 June. The fatwa called for defending Iraqi cities, particularly Baghdad, and to participate in the counter-offensive against ISIL, following the Fall of Mosul on 10 June 2014. The forces brought together a number of Shia militias, most of which receive direct support from Iran, along with a small number of Sunni tribesmen by uniting existing militias under the "People's Mobilization Committee" of the Iraqi Ministry of Interior in June 2014. The forces would fall under the umbrella of the state's security services and within the legal frameworks and practices of the Ministry of Interior. On 19 December 2016, Iraqi President Fuad Masum approved a law passed by parliament in November that incorporated PMU in the country's armed forces. The pro-Assad website Al-Madsar News reports that, with this incorporation, the PMU are now subject to the supreme commander of the national armed forces and will no longer be affiliated to any political or social group. However, many of these irregulars have continued to operate independently of the Iraqi state.

On 21 March 2017, the PMU announced the launch of a special forces course, in order to create a Special Forces Division. The training program covered a variety of missions with direction from the Iraqi Special Operations Forces. On December 11, 2017, the PMU began to be entirely consolidated under the Iraqi Armed Forces, following a call by Ayatollah Ali al-Sistani to integrate. However, as late as May 2018, this integration had yet to take place, and PMF members remained without the same wages and privileges as soldiers in the regular Iraqi Armed Forces.

According to some sources, the Popular Mobilization Forces have made a fundamental difference on the battlefield, as they have undermined the superiority of ISIL at the level of guerrilla warfare, as well as at the level of the psychological operations.

Structure 
The umbrella organization Tribal Mobilization (ar) is also a part of PMU.

In February 2019, (PMF) raided a base belonging to Abu al-Fadl al-Abbas Forces, during the raid the group's leader Aws al-Khafaji was arrested by Iraqi forces, the Popular Mobilization Forces claimed that the raid was part of an ongoing operation to crack down on fake groups claiming to be part of PMF in order to commit crimes. The group also never formally declared itself as part of PMF nor had it ever registered as part of PMF with the Iraqi government.

Composition and organization 
While there are no official data about the strength of the Popular Mobilization Forces, there are some estimates, differing significantly. Around Tikrit reports in 2015 suggested there were about 20,000 engaged militiamen, while the grand total ranges are from 2–5 million to 300,000–450,000 Iraqi armed forces. Higher estimates have included about 40,000 Sunni fighters in 2016, a figure evolving from reports in early 2015, which counted 1,000 to 3,000 Sunni fighters. By early March 2015 the Popular Mobilization Forces appeared to be strengthening its foothold in the Yazidis town of Shingal by recruiting and paying local people.

The Popular Mobilization Forces consist of both new volunteers and pre-existing militias, which have been grouped within the umbrella organization formally under the control of the Ministry of Interior Popular Mobilization Units directorate. Among these militias there are the Peace Companies (formerly known as the Mahdi Army), Kata'ib Hezbollah, Kata'ib Sayyid al-Shuhada, Kata'ib al-Imam Ali, Asa'ib Ahl al-Haq and the Badr Organization.

Prime Minister Haider al-Abadi ordered on April 7, 2015, that the Popular Mobilization Forces be placed under the direct command of the prime minister's office, thus giving a further official status to the militia.

In 2015, the chairman of the Popular Mobilization Committee in the Iraqi government was Falih al-Fayyadh, who is also the National Security Adviser. The Popular Mobilization Committee is under the Office of Prime Minister. The PMF are said to have been led on the battlefields by Jamal Jaafar Mohammed, also known as Abu Mahdi al-Muhandis, the head of Kata'ib Hezbollah, but the chain of command runs through pre-existing leaders. According to Iraqi sources, as well as to the London-based pro-Saudi Asharq Al-Awsat, the different militias rely on their own chain of command, and rarely work together or follow regular Iraqi Army's orders.

The Laws and conduct by which the PMF should abide are those of the Iraqi Government since the Iraqi Prime Minister has the final control over the PMF. Nonetheless, Marja' Ali al-Sistani issued an "Advice and Guidance to the Fighters on the Battlefields" which included a 20 points form of how the PMF should conduct themselves. The main points were that the PMF should treat the liberated areas locals with the Islamic Law which is as quoted from the second point which is a Hadith of the Muslim Prophet Muhammed; "Do not indulge in acts of extremism, do not disrespect dead corpses, do not resort to deceit, do not kill an elder, do not kill a child, do not kill a woman, and do no not cut down trees unless necessity dictates otherwise". Other points included the same aforementioned guidance when treating non-Muslims and also not to steal or disrespect people even if they are the families of the ISIS fighters.

Alongside Abu Mahdi al-Muhandis, other people in charge of the PMF include Qais al-Khazali, commander of Asa'ib Ahl al-Haq, and Hadi Al-Amiri, the chief of the Badr Organization. According to The New York Times, such organizational autonomy may present a challenge to the consolidation of Haider al-Abadi's authority. Volunteers include Shia Arabs, and smaller numbers of Iraqi Christians, Sunni Arabs, and Shia Turkmen.

The militias are trained and supported by military advisers from Turkey (for Sunni and Turkmeni troops), Iran, and Hezbollah, including prominent Quds Force figures, such as (until his 2020 death) Qasem Soleimani. The PMF also appeared to have deployed at least a regiment under the command of Colonel Jumaa al-Jumaily in Al Anbar Governorate. They are also said to have their own military intelligence, administrative systems, a sort of "media war team" that provides morale boosting, battlefield updates and propaganda videos, and a court of law.

Shia Arab component 

According to a Sunni newspaper, there are three main Shia components within the Popular Mobilization Forces: the first are the groups that were formed following Sistani's fatwa, without political roots or ambitions; the second are groups that were formed by political parties or are initially the military wings of these parties, with definite political characterization; the third is the armed groups that have been present in Iraq for years and have fought battles against US forces and also participated in operations in Syria.

According to Faleh A. Jabar and Renad Mansour for The Carnegie Foundation, the Popular Mobilization Forces are factionally divided into three Shia components: a component pledging allegiance to Supreme Leader of Iran Ali Khamenei; a faction pledging allegiance to Grand Ayatollah Ali al-Sistani; and the faction headed by Iraqi cleric Muqtada al-Sadr.

The main Shia faction in the Popular Mobilization Forces is the group which maintains strong ties with Iran and pledge spiritual allegiance to Supreme Leader Ali Khamenei. The pro-Khamanei faction would consist of already established parties and of relatively small paramilitaries: Saraya Khurasani, Kata'ib Hezbollah, Kata'ib Abu Fadhl al-Abbas, the Badr Organization and Asa'ib Ahl al-Haq. These groups serve as a kind of border guard—a sort of Iranian insurance policy against threats on its immediate border. Their leaders publicly take pride in such affiliations, professing religious allegiance to Khamenei and his notion of Vilayat al-Faqih.

According to Faleh A. Jabar and Renad Mansour, the pro-Sistani faction consists of those armed groups formed by Sistani's fatwa to defend Shia holy sites and by paramilitary of the Islamic Supreme Council of Iraq. There are four major groups organized by Najaf: Saraya al-Ataba al-Abbasiya, Saraya al-Ataba al-Hussainiya, Saraya al-Ataba al-Alawiya, and Liwa 'Ali al-Akbar, corresponding to Shia holy sites in Kadhimiya, Karbala, and Najaf. The Islamic Supreme Council of Iraq also swears allegiance to Sistani. After the Badr Organization left the Islamic Supreme Council of Iraq, its leader Ammar al-Hakim formed new paramilitary units, including Saraya el-Jihad, Saraya el-'Aqida, and Saraya 'Ashura.

Muqtada al-Sadr's Peace Companies (Saraya al-Salam) were founded in June 2014 from the Mahdi Army. According to Faleh A. Jabar and Renad Mansour, the Sadrists have largely been cut off from Iranian funding.

According to Shia P.M.F. officials, the recruitment campaign is successful also because it is administered by the religious establishment and Shia religious scholars from the hawza are instrumental in recruitment. Recruitment via Shia Islamist political party structures and even individual clerics or members of parliament is pursued more the official PMF Commission, which lacks recruitment offices.

Sunni Arab component 
In early stages of the PMF, the Shia component was almost exclusive and the Sunni one was negligible since it counted only 1,000 to 3,000 men. In January 2016, Prime Minister Haider al-Abadi approved the appointment of 40,000 Sunni fighters to the Popular Mobilization Forces. According to Al-Monitor, his move was decided in order to give a multiconfessional image to the Forces; however, Sunni fighters began to volunteer even before the al-Abadi's decision. Adding Sunni fighters to the Popular Mobilization Units could set the stage for the force to become the core of the envisioned National Guard. According to The Economist, as of late April 2016 the Hashd had approximately 16,000 Sunnis.

It has been observed that the Sunni Arab tribes that took part in al-Hashd al-Shaabi 2015 recruitment are those which also had good relations with Nouri al-Maliki during his tenure as Prime Minister.

According to Yazan al-Jabouri, a secular Sunni commander of anti-ISIS Liwa Salahaddin, as of November 2016, there were 30,000 Iraqi Sunnis fighting within the ranks of PMUs.

Shia Turkmen component 
The  Turkmen  Hashd  overall constitute around four thousand members and are called “Brigade 12”.

According to Faleh A. Jabar and Renad Mansour for The Carnegie Foundation, Shia Turkmen joined Popular Mobilization Forces in order to increase their local autonomy from Kurdistan and in order to counter Sunni Turkmen, who joined the Islamic State.

Christian component 
There is also Christian and Shabak PMF units in Ninawa plains. The Imam Ali Brigades trained two Christian units called Kata’ib Rouh Allah Issa Ibn Miriam Brigades and Babylon.

Equipment 

The equipment of the Popular Mobilization Forces is a major issue. At the end of January 2015, a video showed a large Kata'ib Hezbollah convoy transporting several American-made military vehicles, including an M1 Abrams Tank, M113 armoured personnel carriers, Humvees, and MRAP vehicles as well as Iranian-made Safir 4×4s and technicals with Kata'ib Hezbollah's flags flying. According to some sources, the Iraqi government is supplying U.S.-provided military equipment to the militias. Iraqi minister of transportation, and the head of the Badr Organization, Hadi Al-Amiri criticized the U.S. for the lack of providing arms. On the other hand, U.S. officials argue that the operators of heavy weapons allegedly taken over by Kata'ib Hezbollah were regular Iraqi soldiers who raised the Hezbollah flag merely in solidarity with the militant group, while the same source acknowledged that it is generally difficult to monitor U.S.-made weapons.

Alongside U.S.-made military equipment handed over to or fallen into the hands of Popular Mobilization Forces, Iran is a major supplier. According to some sources, in 2014 Tehran sold Baghdad nearly $10 billion worth of weapons and hardware. Furthermore, there is a daily supply of Iranian weapons, including Iranian-made 106 mm anti-tank guns as well as 120 mm, 82 mm and 60 mm mortars.

In May 2015, the United States started delivering about $1.6 billion worth of military equipment under the supervision of the Government of Iraq. According to some sources, the major beneficiaries of the weapons deliveries are to be the Popular Mobilization Forces.

Heavy armour seems to be operated by Popular Mobilization Forces in the operations surrounding the battle of Mosul.

History and major engagements 
The Popular Mobilization Forces have been involved in several battles of the military intervention against the Islamic State of Iraq and the Levant since their founding, the most important being the Second Battle of Tikrit. After the end of the battle of Tikrit, the complex of occupation forces handed over security issues to local police and security forces.

On Monday April 6, 2015, Iraqi Prime Minister Haider al-Abadi said that, while being heavily involved in the conquest of Tikrit, the Popular Mobilization Forces will not join the planned Mosul conquest. This statement was reversed in March 2016, when al-Abadi reportedly rejected calls by Nineveh's provincial council to prohibit Popular Mobilization Forces from taking part in retaking Mosul.

Shia volunteers reportedly entered Al Anbar Governorate on very first days of May 2015, among heavy protests of Sunnite personalities, with limited operations continuing in 2016.

In Autumn 2016, they participated in the Mosul Offensive acting as left flank of the anti-IS forces, and by November had captured a number of smaller towns and villages from IS, expanding roughly along a line from Qayyarah to Tal Afar, while keeping a distance (20+ km) to the city of Mosul itself.

In October 2017, the PMF was part of the Iraqi government forces that recaptured Kirkuk, which had been under Kurdish control since 2014.

Engagement in Syria 
PMF militias have been heavily deployed in the Syrian Civil War on the side of the government, often with the stated aim of defending Shi'ite shrines. Although at the time of the formation of the PMF, most of its component groups were primarily engaged in Iraq against ISIL, after the reduction of the immediate ISIL threat in Iraq from 2015, many returned to Syria. For instance, in January 2015 Kata’ib Sayyid al-Shuhada announced the deaths of two of its fighters in defense of Sayeda Zainab in Damascus, and the militia's involvement in the 2015 Southern Syria offensive was documented by the Iraqi TV station Al-Anwar 2. Between 2013 and early 2016, 1,200 Iraqi fighters died in Syria, including combatants of PMF militias Asa'ib Ahl al-Haq and Kata'ib al-Imam Ali, among them senior commanders Abu al-Fadl and Abu Haider al-Nazari.

Terrorism 
Kata'ib Hizballah, one of the forces of the PMF, is listed by Japan's Public Security Intelligence Agency as a terrorist organization.  The United Arab Emirates also classifies it as terrorist.  Kata'ib Hizballah was designated a terrorist organization in 2009 by the United States.  Its leader, Abu Mahdi al-Muhandis, was also designated a terrorist. In 2020, Asa'ib Ahl al-Haq, a powerful Iran-backed militia that is part of the PMF, was designated as a terrorist organization by the U.S.

Involvement in 2019–2021 Iraqi protests 
During the 2019–2021 Iraqi protests, which called for the end of the sectarian political system, the PMF militias took part in the protests by using live bullets, marksmen, hot water, hot pepper gas and tear gas against protesters, leading to over 1,000 deaths and over 30,000 injuries.

Domestic criticisms and war crimes accusations 
Some of the militias constituting the Popular Mobilization Forces have been accused of war crimes motivated by sectarian revenge. According to Amnesty International in 2014, Shia militias have abducted, tortured and killed numerous Sunni civilians and, according to Western sources, in Tikrit militants have committed some violence, while being publicly praised; In the wake of the conquest of Tikrit, Iraqi authorities declared that war crimes would be investigated and their perpetrators punished.

High Shia authorities, such as Grand Ayatollah Ali al-Sistani and Ayatollah Hussein Al-Sadr, called on the militants in the PMF to refrain from war crimes or other despicable behaviour. In 2015, ad hoc government inquiry committees were established to investigate civilian deaths attributed to the militias.

In 2016, Mosul Sunni dignitaries and officials accused the PMF of killings of Sunnis, takeovers of schools and forcing Sunnis to sell property in the prime real estate area close to the Mosul shrine. According to City council's deputy chairman Muzher Fleih, 650 Sunnis have disappeared. Militia leaders insist any abuses are isolated incidents, and target only captured Islamic State's collaborators.

Alongside war crimes accusations, concerns regarding the constitutionality and politicization of al-Hashd al-Shaabi have been raised. Sunni sources have called for depoliticization of the Popular Mobilization Forces, to be achieved under the proposed National Guard bill. According to some critics in 2015, the Popular Mobilization Forces were not sanctioned by the Constitution of Iraq and nonetheless had a budget and were paid on regular basis by the Iraqi government, whilst the legally established Peshmerga had not received their wages. The official status and actual dependence of the Popular Mobilization Forces on the Baghdad government and its help was not fully resolved as of late 2015. However, by the end of 2016, a law was passed bringing the PMU under the auspices of the Supreme Commander of the Iraqi National Army, incorporating PMF units into the official army of Iraq and removing any official affiliation with any social, religious or political group.

Recruitment of Yazidis in Kurdish areas has been deemed to go against official Kurdish policy against the move: in February 2015, Kurdistan Region President Massoud Barzani asked the Peshmerga minister to stop all militia activities in the area.

Allegedly, clerics from the Najaf Seminary, including Grand Ayatollah Ali al-Sistani, also criticized the monopolistic conduct of Abu Mahdi al-Muhandis.

Concerns about growth 
The Popular Mobilization Forces are accused of accruing a power base in Iraq and of being Iran's instrument to dominate Iraq. The main fears are that the permanent militia would turn themselves into enforcers of Shia domination. The Iraqi Police headquarters in the Muthanna Governorate announced that they were in the process of commissioning Popular Mobilization battalions with security tasks in early January 2016. These tasks included protecting public and private establishments in open desert areas, among others. Other reports indicate that Popular Mobilization is securing border outlets and controlling security in liberated cities.

According to General Ali Omran, commander of the army's 5th Infantry Division, P.M.F. militias are too entrenched in politics and at risk of "coming to blows" with the Armed Forces. In February 2016, militiamen refused orders to vacate a building in a military base north of Baghdad.

According to AP-interviewed government officials and militia leaders, due to the fear of a return to Sunni minority rule over the Iraqi Shia majority, PMF militias want to remain a permanent, independent armed force; Hamed al-Jazaeery, head of the al-Khorasani Brigades militia, stated that the model is the Islamic Revolutionary Guard Corps.

International reactions 
 : In a 2015 speech of its Special Representative and head of the UN Assistance Mission in Iraq (UNAMI), Jan Kubis mentioned the Popular Mobilization Forces, saying that the Iraqi security forces, with the critical support of the Popular Mobilization Forces, tribal Sunni volunteers, and the International Coalition, have yet to significantly change the situation on the ground"
  CJTF–OIR: In 2016, Commander of the CJTF-OIR Lt Gen. Stephen J. Townsend described the PMF militias as "remarkably disciplined" allies since he arrived. He added that the PMF could make Iraq more secure—if they become a national guard-like force, and not a "puppet" of Iran.
 : In 2016, Saudi Arabian Foreign Minister Adel al-Jubeir said that the Popular Mobilization Forces, the Iraqi Shiite militia, is the "religious organization," carrying out mass killings in the country with support of Iranian generals.

American-led airstrikes 
Kata’ib Sayyid al-Shuhada, a member of the PMF, stated that their forces were bombed by US planes on 7 August 2017, in Al Anbar Governorate near the Iraq–Syria border and that Hashd al-Shaabi forces suffered many casualties. The Baghdad-based spokesman of the U.S.-led coalition, Army Col. Ryan Dillon, dismissed the allegation, saying on Twitter that no coalition airstrikes took place in the area at the time. According to the militia's deputy, Ahmed al-Maksousi, they were hit by artillery fire in Syria's Jamouna area, about 12 kilometers (about 7.5 miles) from the Iraqi border. Along with 40 killed, many militiamen were wounded, al-Maksousi added.

On 22 August 2019, The Popular Mobilization Forces (PMF), blamed the United States and Israel for a number of bombings on their warehouses and bases. The group accused the US of permitting Israeli drones to join its forces for executing attacks on Iraqi territory. The group pledged to counter any attack in the future. On 23 August, a fatwa issued by Ayatollah Kazem al-Haeri called for attacks against US troops in Iraq, "the presence of any US military force in Iraq is forbidden (haram) under any title: military training, advice or the rationale of fighting terrorism".

On 29 December 2019, the United States bombed the headquarters of PMF member Kata'ib Hezbollah near Al-Qa'im, killing 25 militiamen.

On 3 January 2020, PMF commander Abu Mahdi al-Muhandis, PMF PR head Mohammed Redha al-Jabri, and the Quds Force head, Qasem Soleimani, were among those killed in an assassination near  Baghdad Airport.

On 12 March 2020, the U.S. launched air raids against five Kata'ib Hezbollah weapons storage bases across Iraq in retaliation for the 2020 Camp Taji attacks.

On 25 February 2021, a U.S. air raid killed one and wounded four while targeting PMF facilities on the Iraqi-Syrian border in Syria's eastern Deir ez-Zor Governorate. The facilities were used by PMF forces combatting ISIL in collaboration with the Iraqi and Syrian governments. U.S. officials described the PMF as an "Iranian-backed militia" and the air strike as a retaliation for purported Iranian military aggression against U.S. facilities in Iraq, while Iranian officials denied involvement. Iraqi officials repudiated any connection between the PMF and the insurgents who previously attacked U.S. facilities. The Pentagon asserted that the air raid followed consultation with the Iraqi government and other partners in the region, but the Iraqi military denied providing the U.S. with information regarding locations within Syria.

On 27 June 2021 US forces bombed two locations after an increase in drone attacks.  One location was a drone-making facility and the other a conventional weapons exchange depot. Four members of Kataib Sayyed al-Shuhada faction were claimed to have been killed in the action.

See also 

 Holy Shrine Defender
 Iranian intervention in Iraq (2014–present)
 Iraqi insurgency
 List of armed groups in the Iraqi Civil War
 List of armed groups in the Syrian Civil War
 Private militias in Iraq
2019–2021 Iraqi protests

References

External links 
 
 

 
2014 establishments in Iraq
Anti-ISIL factions in Iraq
Anti-ISIL factions in Syria
Counterinsurgency organizations
Institutions of the Iraqi Council of Ministers
Iran–Iraq relations
Iraq–Syria relations
Iraqi nationalism
Islamism in Iraq
Military units and formations established in 2014
Military units and formations of Iraq
Organizations established in 2014
Paramilitary forces of Iraq
Persecution of LGBT people
Political party alliances in Iraq
Pro-government factions of the Syrian civil war
Violence against LGBT people
War in Iraq (2013–2017)